The UNESCO Courier is the main magazine published by the United Nations Educational, Scientific and Cultural Organization (UNESCO). It has the largest and widest-ranging readership of all the journals published by the United Nations and its specialized institutions.

History and profile
UNESCO Courier was started in 1948 by Sandy Koffler (1916–2020). There was a gap in publication from 2013 until 2017. The magazine has changed a great deal over the years, both in content and in form. But it pursues its original mission: promote UNESCO's ideals, maintain a platform for the dialogue between cultures and provide a forum for international debate.

The printed UNESCO Courier covers issues of literacy, human rights, environment, culture, science and arts.

Available online since March 2006, The UNESCO Courier serves readers around the world: It is available for free on PDF in the six official languages of the organization (English, French, Spanish, Arabic, Russian and Chinese), as well as in Portuguese and Esperanto. A limited number of printed issues are also produced.
 The UNESCO Courier – in English
The UNESCO Courier – in French
The UNESCO Courier – in Spanish
The UNESCO Courier – in Arabic
 The UNESCO Courier – in Chinese
 The UNESCO Courier – in Russian
 The UNESCO Courier – in Portuguese
 The UNESCO Courier – in Esperanto

The magazine is also translated into Sardinian and Sicilian.

The texts of current issues are available in Open Access under the Attribution-ShareAlike 3.0 IGO (CC-BY-SA 3.0 IGO) license.

Editors-in-chief 
Current Director is Matthieu Guével and Editor-in-Chief is Agnès Bardon.

Previous directors:
Jasmina Sopova since April 2007
Enzo Fazzino 2006
Vincent Defourny 2005
Michel Barton 2002–2004
J. Burnet 2000–2001
John Kohut 1999–2000
Sophie Bessis 1998
Bahgat El Nadi et Adel Rifaat 1988–1998
Édouard Glissant 1982–1988
Jean Gaudin 1979–1982
René Calloz 1977–1978
Sandy Koffler 1951–1977
Peter du Berg 1950
Sandy Koffler 1948–1950

References

External links
 UNESCO Portal

Online magazines published in the United States
Defunct magazines published in the United States
Magazines established in 1948
Magazines disestablished in 2006
Multilingual magazines
Online magazines with defunct print editions
UNESCO